The Bard Prison Initiative (BPI) is a program of Bard College that provides college education to people in prison. Currently operating in six prisons across New York State, BPI's academic programs engage students in the full breadth of liberal study and end in associate and bachelor's degrees from Bard.  It currently enrolls 350 students full-time in liberal arts programs.  BPI first started making the news when its debate team won against Harvard University in 2015.  Since federal funding for prison education programs was eliminated in 1995, BPI is one of a limited number of college degree granting programs available in U.S. prisons.

BPI is also the home of the Consortium for the Liberal Arts in Prison, which recruits, assists, and collaborates with colleges and universities across the country as they enter this field of work and reestablish college opportunity for people in prison in their home states.

BPI is the subject of College Behind Bars, a 2019 documentary executive produced by Ken Burns.

References

External links 

PBS documentary on BPI, from Ken Burns
Consortium for the Liberal Arts in Prison

Bard College
Prison charities based in the United States
Charities based in New York (state)